Oncology is a branch of medicine that deals with the study, treatment, diagnosis and prevention of tumors. A medical professional who practices oncology is an oncologist. The name's etymological origin is the Greek word ὄγκος (ónkos), meaning "tumor", "volume" or "mass". Oncology is concerned with:
 The diagnosis of any cancer in a person (pathology)
 Therapy (e.g. surgery, chemotherapy, radiotherapy and other modalities)
 Follow-up of cancer patients after successful treatment
 Palliative care of patients with terminal malignancies
 Ethical questions surrounding cancer care
 Screening efforts:
 of populations, or
 of the relatives of patients (in types of cancer that are thought to have a hereditary basis, such as breast cancer)

Diagnosis 
Medical histories remain an important screening tool: the character of the complaints and nonspecific symptoms (such as fatigue, weight loss, unexplained anemia, fever of unknown origin, paraneoplastic phenomena and other signs) may warrant further investigation for malignancy. Occasionally, a physical examination may find the location of a malignancy.

Diagnostic methods include:
 Biopsy or resection; these are methods by which suspicious neoplastic growths can be removed in part or in whole, and evaluated by a pathologist to determine malignancy. This is currently the gold standard for the diagnosis of cancer and is crucial in guiding the next step in management (active surveillance, surgery, radiation therapy, chemotherapy or a combination of these)
 Endoscopy, either upper or lower gastrointestinal, cystoscopy, bronchoscopy, or nasendoscopy; to localise areas suspicious for malignancy and biopsy when necessary.
 X-rays, CT scanning, MRI scanning, ultrasound and other radiological techniques to localise and guide biopsy.
 Scintigraphy, single photon emission computed tomography (SPECT), positron emission tomography (PET) and other methods of nuclear medicine to identify areas suspicious for malignancy.
 Blood tests, including tumor markers, which can increase the suspicion of certain types of cancers.

Apart from diagnoses, these modalities (especially imaging by CT scanning) are often used to determine operability, i.e. whether it is surgically possible to remove a tumor in its entirety.

Currently, a tissue diagnosis (from a biopsy) by a pathologist is essential for the proper classification of cancer and to guide the next step of treatment. On extremely rare instances when this is not possible, "empirical therapy" (without an exact diagnosis) may be considered, based on the available evidence (e.g. history, x-rays and scans.)

On very rare occasions, a metastatic lump or pathological lymph node is found (typically in the neck) for which a primary tumor cannot be found. However, immunohistochemical markers often give a strong indication of the primary malignancy. This situation is referred to as "malignacy of unknown primary", and again, treatment is empirical based on past experience of the most likely origin.

Therapy
Depending upon the cancer identified, followup and palliative care will be administered at that time. Certain disorders (such as ALL or AML) will require immediate admission and chemotherapy, while others will be followed up with regular physical examination and blood tests.

Often, surgery is attempted to remove a tumor entirely. This is only feasible when there is some degree of certainty that the tumor can in fact be removed. When it is certain that parts will remain, curative surgery is often impossible, e.g. when there are metastases, Occasionally, when the tumor has invaded a structure that cannot be operated upon without risking the patient's life. Occasionally surgery can improve survival even if not all tumour tissue has been removed; the procedure is referred to as "debulking" (i.e. reducing the overall amount of tumour tissue). Surgery is also used for the palliative treatment of some of cancers, e.g. to relieve biliary obstruction, or to relieve the problems associated with some cerebral tumors. The risks of surgery must be weighed against the benefits.

Chemotherapy and radiotherapy are used as a first-line radical therapy in a number of malignancies. They are also used for adjuvant therapy, i.e. when the macroscopic tumor has already been completely removed surgically but there is a reasonable statistical risk that it will recur. Chemotherapy and radiotherapy are commonly used for palliation, where disease is clearly incurable: in this situation the aim is to improve the quality of life and to prolong it.

Hormone manipulation is well established, particularly in the treatment of breast and prostate cancer.

There is currently a rapid expansion in the use of monoclonal antibody treatments, notably for lymphoma (Rituximab) and breast cancer (Trastuzumab).

Vaccine and other immunotherapies are the subject of intensive research.

Palliative care
Approximately 50% of all cancer cases in the Western world can be treated to remission with radical treatment. For pediatric   patients, that number is much higher. A large number of cancer patients will die from the disease, and a significant proportion of patients with incurable cancer will die of other causes. There may be ongoing issues with symptom control associated with progressive cancer, and also with the treatment of the disease. These problems may include pain, nausea, anorexia, fatigue, immobility, and depression. Not all issues are strictly physical: personal dignity may be affected. Moral and spiritual issues are also important.

While many of these problems fall within the remit of the oncologist, palliative care has matured into a separate, closely allied speciality to address the problems associated with advanced disease. Palliative care is an essential part of the multidisciplinary cancer care team. Palliative care services may be less hospital-based than oncology, with nurses and doctors who are able to visit the patient at home.

Ethical issues
There are a number of recurring ethical questions and dilemmas in oncological practice. These include:
 What information to give the patient regarding disease extent/progression/prognosis.
 Entry into clinical trials, especially in the face of terminal illness.
 Withdrawal of active treatment.
 "Do Not Resuscitate" orders and other end of life issues.

These issues are closely related to the patients' personality, religion, culture, and family life. Though these issues are complex and emotional, the answers are often achieved by the patient seeking counsel from trusted personal friends and advisors. It requires a degree of sensitivity and very good communication on the part of the oncology team to address these problems properly.

Progress and research
There is a tremendous amount of research being conducted on all frontiers of oncology, ranging from cancer cell biology, radiation therapy to chemotherapy treatment regimens and optimal palliative care and pain relief. In the past decade, the advent of next-generation sequencing and whole-genome sequencing has completely changed our understanding of cancers. Identification of novel genetic/molecular markers will dramatically change how we diagnose and treat cancer, which will pave the way for personalized medicine.

Therapeutic trials often involve patients from many different hospitals in a particular region. In the UK, patients are often enrolled in large studies coordinated by Cancer Research UK (CRUK), Medical Research Council (MRC), the European Organisation for Research and Treatment of Cancer (EORTC) or the National Cancer Research Network (NCRN).

The most valued companies worldwide whose leading products are in Oncology include Pfizer (United States), Roche (Switzerland), Merck (United States), AstraZeneca (United Kingdom), Novartis (Switzerland) and Bristol-Myers Squibb (United States) who are active in the treatment areas Kinase inhibitors, Antibodies, Immuno-oncology and Radiopharmaceuticals.

Specialties 
 The four main divisions:
 Medical oncology: focuses on treatment of cancer with chemotherapy, targeted therapy, immunotherapy, and hormonal therapy.
 Surgical oncology: focuses on treatment of cancer with surgery.
 Radiation oncology: focuses on treatment of cancer with radiation.
 Clinical oncology: focuses on treatment of cancer with both systemic therapies and radiation.
 Sub-specialties in Oncology:
 Neuro-oncology: focuses on cancers of brain.
 Ocular oncology: focuses on cancers of eye.
 Head & Neck oncology: focuses on cancers of oral cavity, nasal cavity, oropharynx, hypopharynx and larynx.
 Thoracic oncology: focuses on cancers of lung, mediastinum, oesophagus and pleura.
 Breast oncology: focuses on cancers of breast.
 Gastrointestinal oncology: focuses on cancers of stomach, colon, rectum, anal canal, liver, gallbladder, pancreas.
 Bone & Musculoskeletal oncology: focuses on cancers of bones and soft tissue.
 Dermatological oncology: focuses on the medical and surgical treatment of skin, hair, sweat gland, and nail cancers
 Genitourinary oncology: focuses on cancers of genital and urinary system.
 Gynecologic oncology: focuses on cancers of the female reproductive system.
 Pediatric oncology: concerned with the treatment of cancer in children.
 Adolescent and young adult (AYA) oncology.
 Hemato oncology: focuses on cancers of blood and stem cell transplantation.
 Preventive oncology: focuses on epidemiology & prevention of cancer.
 Geriatric oncology: focuses on cancers in elderly population.
 Pain & Palliative oncology: focuses on treatment of end stage cancer to help alleviate pain and suffering.
 Molecular oncology: focuses on molecular diagnostic methods in oncology.
 Nuclear medicine oncology: focuses on diagnosis and treatment of cancer with radiopharmaceuticals.
 Psycho-oncology: focuses on psychosocial issues on diagnosis and treatment of cancer patients.
 Veterinary oncology: focuses on treatment of cancer in animals.
 Emerging specialties:
 Cardiooncology is a branch of cardiology that addresses the cardiovascular impact of cancer and its treatments.

See also 

 Cancer research
 Comparative oncology
 Oncology nursing
 Oncometabolism
 Tumour heterogeneity
 Warburg effect (oncology)

Organizations

 American Cancer Society
 American Cancer Society Cancer Action Network
 American Cancer Society Center
 American Society of Clinical Oncology
 Canadian Cancer Society
 Cancer Research UK
 National Cancer Institute
 National Comprehensive Cancer Network
 Programme of Action for Cancer Therapy

References

Further reading

External links